Marten Falls First Nation is an Anishinaabe First Nation reserve located in northern Ontario. The First Nation occupies communities on both sides of the Albany River in Northern Ontario, including Ogoki Post (Ojibwe: Ogookiing) in the Cochrane District and Marten Falls in the Kenora District. As of December 2013, the First Nation had a total registered population of 728 people, of which their on-reserve population was 328 people.

Profile

Ogoki is a First Nation community managed by the Marten Falls Band. It has a registered population of roughly four hundred people, with additional transient residents fulfilling healthcare, teaching or policing roles. The town is served by Ogoki Post Airport, and has its own community radio station, CKFN 89.9 FM (a repeater of CKWT-FM).

The only road access to the community is through winter roads. However, from 2000 to 2014 there were no winter roads into the community; recently, the community has worked to maintain the ice road. The community is fly-in only in terms of all year travel.

Government

Governance
The Marten Falls First Nation elects their council members through the Act Electoral System for a two-year term, consisting of a chief and seven councillors. Chief Ambrose Achneepineskum's term ran from September 30, 2017, to September 29, 2019. The Seven (7) councillors are: Russell Achneepineskum, Paul Achneepineskum, Sam Achneepineskum Sr, Grace Bottle, Linda Moonias, Robert Moonias,

Council
As a signatory to Treaty 9, the Marten Falls First Nation is a member of the Matawa First Nations, a Regional Chief's Council, and the Nishnawbe Aski Nation, a Tribal Political Organization representing majority of the First Nations in northern Ontario. Through these council memberships, the First Nation receives additional services, ranging from Economic Development assistance and Health Care assistance to Nishnawbe-Aski Police Service.

Services
The healthcare in the community is serviced by a First Nations Inuit Health (a branch of Health Canada) clinic staffed by community health nurses (CHN). There is a K-8 school (Henry Coaster Memorial School) that staffs teachers from both outside the community and within the First Nation. The on-reserve version of Children's Aid is provided through Tikinagan Child and Family Services. Ogoki is policed by the Nishnawbe-Aski Police Service, an Aboriginal-based service.

Reserve

History

Marten Falls was the home of Chanie Wenjack, a young boy who died in 1966 while trying to return home after escaping from an Indian residential school. His story was dramatized in Secret Path, a multimedia music, film and graphic novel project by Gord Downie and Jeff Lemire.

Transportation
Marten Falls is proposing a new all-season access road to be built to replace the winter road. The new road will connect to Ontario Highway 643 at its northern terminus northwest of Aroland.

References

External links
AANDC profile
Chiefs of Ontario profile

Communities in Cochrane District
Nishnawbe Aski Nation
First Nations governments in Ontario
Hudson's Bay Company trading posts
Communities in Kenora District
Anishinaabe reserves in Ontario